Mount Royal is a large hill in Montreal, Quebec, Canada

Mount Royal, Mont Royal, and similar, may also refer to:

Mountains, places, and other geographic features

Australia
 Mount Royal Range, part of a UNESCO World Heritage Site in Barrington Tops National Park
Mount Royal (New South Wales), a peak within the range
Mount Royal National Park, a national park located partially on the range
 Mount Royal, a heritage-listed mansion in Strathfield, NSW, which is now the Mount St Mary Campus of the Australian Catholic University.

Canada

Alberta
Mount Royal, Calgary, a wealthy area of the city of Calgary
Mount Royal University, a graduate university located in Calgary

Quebec
 Mount Royal, a large hill in the centre of Montreal Island
 Mount Royal Park, the central park of Montreal, on the eponymous hill
 Mount Royal Tunnel, a tunnel through Mount Royal
 Mount Royal Cross, a Montreal landmark atop Mount Royal
 Mount Royal Cemetery, a cemetery on the slopes of Mount Royal
Mount Royal, Quebec, suburb of Montreal
Mont-Royal (AMT), a commuter rail station on the AMT Deux-Montagnes Line in the Town of Mount Royal
Baron Strathcona and Mount Royal, or Baron Mount Royal, the British Barony based in Mount Royal
Mount Royal Avenue or Avenue du Mont-Royal, a street in Montreal and Outremont in Quebec
Mount Royal Arena, a former home of the Montreal Canadiens NHL Hockey Club
Mont-Royal (Montreal Metro), a Montreal Metro station on Line 2 
Les Fusiliers Mont-Royal, one of the oldest surviving units in the Canadian army
Mount Royal (electoral district), a federal electoral district that includes the Town of Mount Royal
Mont-Royal (provincial electoral district), a provincial electoral district that includes the Town of Mount Royal
Les Cours Mont-Royal, a Montreal shopping centre, part of the Montreal Underground City

Other parts of Canada
Mount Royal, Saskatoon, a neighbourhood on the city's west side
Mount Royal, Prince Edward Island, an unincorporated area in Prince Edward Island

France
 Mont-Royal is the pre-Revolutionary name of the commune of Sarreinsberg in Moselle
 Château Mont-Royal, a chateau in La Chapelle-en-Serval, Oise

Germany
 Mont Royal, Germany (fortress), ruins of a fortress on the same-named hill, near Traben-Trarbach, Rhineland-Palatinate

United States
 Mount Royal (Colorado), a mountain near Frisco, Colorado
 Mount Royal (Florida), a site in Putnam County, on the National Register of Historic Places
 Mount Royal (New York), a mountain in Schoharie County
 Mount Royal, New Jersey, a town in Gloucester County
 Mount Royal Station (Maryland Institute College of Art) in Baltimore, Maryland
 University of Baltimore / Mt. Royal (Baltimore Light Rail station)

Other
Mount Royal (sternwheeler), operated on the Skeena River in British Columbia
Mount Royal (TV series), a 1980s television drama TV series, Canada-France coproduction
Mount Royal (album), a Grammy-nominated album by guitarists Julian Lage and Chris Eldridge

See also

 
 
 Mont Royal station (disambiguation)
 Montreal (disambiguation)
 Monte Real, Portugal
 Mons Regalis, Jordan
 Mount Royal (train), a night train of the Rutland Railroad
 Réalmont, France
 Realmonte, Sicily
 Monreale, Sicily
 , a Royal Canadian Navy ship name
  K677
 Regal Mountain
 Royal Mountains
 Cordillera Real (disambiguation)